The Men's African Olympic Qualifier is the African qualification tournament for the men's field hockey event at the Summer Olympics. It is held every four years and was introduced after field hockey was removed from the All-Africa Games program. The first edition was held in Nairobi, Kenya simultaneously with the 2007 All-Africa Games.

Results

Summaries

Top four statistics

* = host nation

Team appearances

See also
Field hockey at the African Games
Men's Hockey Africa Cup of Nations
Women's African Olympic Qualifier

References

Olympic qualifier
 Men